Marlene Mizzi (born 24 December 1954, Rabat, Malta) is a Maltese politician and former Member of the European Parliament. She currently serves as the Maltese ambassador to Sweden and Norway. She was a member of the Labour Party and sat within the Progressive Alliance of Socialists and Democrats in the European Parliament. She served as an MEP between 2013 and 2019.

Background
The daughter of John Cacciottolo and Josephine Micallef, she is married to Judge Emeritus and current Commissioner of Laws Antonio Mizzi. They have one daughter, Alexandra, who is a lawyer. Mizzi graduated with an honours degree in economics in 1976, continuing her studies at the Maastricht School of Management, where she read for a Master of Philosophy degree, specialising in corporate governance. From 1997 to 2005 she served as Chairman of Sea Malta Co Ltd., Malta's national shipping line.
Marlene Mizzi was a member of Group of the Progressive Alliance of Socialist and Democrats, a Vice-President of the Petitions Committee, a Member of the Internal Market and Consumer Protection Committee and substitute member of the Culture, Education and Sports Committee. In 2016-2017 Marlene Mizzi was an Ambassador for the Erasmus for Young Entrepreneurs Programme.

Political career
On April 24, 2013, Mizzi was elected as Malta's first woman Member of the European Parliament, in a casula election, replacing Edward Scicluna. During her first year in parliament, she served as vice-chairwoman of the Committee on Economic and Monetary Affairs, under the leadership of chairwoman Sharon Bowles. Following the 2014 European elections, Mizzi became vice-chairwoman of the Committee on Petitions and a member of the Committee on the Internal Market and Consumer Protection. In 2016, she was named the parliament’s rapporteur on standardization.

Mizzi is a strong proponent of women's rights. In 2016 she hosted a women's rights discussion at American Embassy in Malta.  She hosted a conference on female entrepreneurship in the European Parliament in Brussels. The goal of the conference was to promote inclusive female entrepreneurship and provide a better entrepreneurial environment for women.

In addition to her committee assignments, Mizzi served as a member of the parliament’s delegation to the Parliamentary Assembly of the Mediterranean since 2013. She was also a member of the European Parliament Intergroup on the Welfare and Conservation of Animals.

Mizzi did not seek re-election to the Parliament in 2019. In 2020, she was appointed Maltese Ambassador to the Kingdom of Sweden and Norway, and presented her credentials to representatives of the respective monarchs.

References

External links

Living people
1954 births
MEPs for Malta 2014–2019
Labour Party (Malta) MEPs
Women MEPs for Malta
21st-century Maltese women politicians
21st-century Maltese politicians
People from Rabat, Malta
20th-century Maltese businesspeople